Dream Part.01 is the fourth extended play by South Korean boy band Astro. It was released by Fantagio Music on May 29, 2017, and distributed by Interpark. The EP contains eight tracks including the lead single "Baby".

Track listing

Charts

Weekly charts

Monthly charts

Year-end charts

Release history

References 

2017 EPs
Astro (South Korean band) albums
Interpark Music EPs